The first season of the Syfy reality television series Face Off featured twelve prosthetic makeup artists competing in a series of challenges to create makeup effects. The winner received  and a year's supply of makeup. The season premiered on January 26, 2011. Conor McCullagh of Orlando, Florida was the winner of Face Off season one.

Judges
Glenn Hetrick
Ve Neill
Patrick Tatopoulos
McKenzie Westmore (Host)

Contestants

Contestant progress

 The contestant won Face Off.
  The contestant was a runner-up.
 The contestant won a Spotlight Challenge.
 The contestant was part of a team that won the Spotlight Challenge.
 The contestant was in the top in the Spotlight Challenge.
 The contestant was in the bottom in the Spotlight Challenge.
 The contestant was in the bottom in the Spotlight Challenge and was nominated by the winner, but was not eliminated.
 The contestant was eliminated.
 The contestant was nominated by the winner to be eliminated and was then eliminated. 
‡ The contestant won the Foundation Challenge.

Episodes

{| class="wikitable plainrowheaders" style="width:100%; margin:auto;"
|- style="color:white"
! scope="col" style="background:#b50000; width:12em;"|No. inseries
! scope="col" style="background:#b50000; width:12em;"|No. inseason
! scope="col" style="background:#b50000;"|Title  
! scope="col" style="background:#b50000; width:12em;"|Original air date 
! scope="col" style="background:#b50000; width:12em;"|U.S. viewers(million)
! scope="col" style="background:#b50000; width:12em;"|18-49Rating
 
  
 
 
 
 
 
 
|}

References

External links

 
 

2011 American television seasons
Face Off (TV series)